Isoa Coalala Neivua (born 7 June 1978 in Mosimosi, Sigatoka, Fiji) is a Fijian  rugby union player. He plays as a wing or centre.

Career
Playing in Fiji, he moved from Navosa to Nadroga in 2003 to get more chance of being spotted by for the national team. A great showing in the Colonial Cup saw Neivua dubbed as the next Rupeni Caucau, but injury ruled  him out of the Pacific Tri-Nations tournament. His return to the Nadroga jersey came just in time for the knock-out stages of the Telecom Fiji Cup where he was instrumental in Nadro's semi-final win over Naitasiri. He also scored a powerful try in the final. On his unofficial Fiji debut against the NZ Divisional XV in 2004, he scored a try just six minutes after coming  on as a substitute in the second half. He made his debut in the Pacific Nations Cup loss against Samoa in Apia in 2007. Neivua was chosen as one of the 3 wingers for the 2007 Rugby World Cup ahead of star wingers Rupeni Caucau and Sireli Bobo. He most recently played for Viadana in Italy. He now plays for Nadroga back in Fiji.
Neivua got to start for  the BarbariansRFC against the Springboks later in 2007

External links
 Fiji profile
 Scrum profile

1978 births
Living people
Fijian rugby union players
Rugby union wings
Fiji international rugby union players
Fijian expatriate rugby union players
Expatriate rugby union players in New Zealand
Fijian expatriate sportspeople in New Zealand
Rugby Viadana players
Expatriate rugby union players in Italy
Fijian expatriate sportspeople in Italy
People from Sigatoka
I-Taukei Fijian people